Edward Ryon Makuahanai Aikau (Kahului, Hawaii, May 5, 1946 – March 17, 1978) was a Hawaiian lifeguard and surfer. As the first lifeguard at Waimea Bay on the island of Oahu, he saved over 500 people and became famous for surfing the big Hawaiian surf, winning several awards including the 1977 Duke Kahanamoku Invitational Surfing Championship. The Eddie Aikau Big Wave Invitational ("The Eddie") is named in his honor. He was also a crew member on the Polynesian voyaging canoe Hōkūleʻa.

Life
Born in Kahului, Maui, Aikau was the second child of Solomon and Henrietta Aikau. The words Makua Hanai in Eddie Aikau's full name means feeding parent, an adoptive, nurturing, fostering parent, in the Hawaiian language. He was a descendant of Hewahewa, the kahuna nui (high priest) of King Kamehameha I and his successor Kamehameha II. Aikau first learned how to surf  on the shorebreak of Kahului Harbor. He moved to Oahu with his family in 1959, and at the age of 16 left school and started working at the Dole pineapple cannery; the paycheck allowed Aikau to buy his first surfboard. In 1968, he became the first lifeguard hired by the City & County of Honolulu to work on the North Shore. The City & County of Honolulu gave Aikau the task of covering all of the beaches between Sunset and Haleiwa. In 1971, Aikau was named Lifeguard of the Year. In 1977 Aikau won the Duke Kahanamoku Invitational Surfing Championship.

On February 28, 1978, TV producer John Orland was the last person Aikau rescued at Waimea Bay.

Lost at sea
In 1978, the Polynesian Voyaging Society was seeking volunteers for a 30-day,  journey to re-enact the ancient route of the Polynesian migration between the Hawaiian and Tahitian island chains. Aikau joined the voyage as a crew member. The double-hulled voyaging canoe Hōkūleʻa left the Hawaiian islands on March 16, 1978. It developed a leak in one of its hulls and later capsized about twelve miles (19 km) south of the island of Molokaʻi. In an attempt to get help, Aikau paddled toward Lānaʻi on his surfboard. Although the rest of the crew were later rescued by the U.S. Coast Guard Cutter Cape Corwin, Aikau's body was never found. He removed his life jacket since it was hindering his paddling of the surfboard. The ensuing search for Aikau was the largest air-sea search in Hawaiian history.

Memorial surfing invitational
In Aikau's honor, the surfwear company Quiksilver sponsored “The Eddie” until 2016. The event was cancelled for 2017 but the AiKau has brought it back with largely local sponsors for 2018-19  – the Quiksilver Big Wave Invitational in Memory of Eddie Aikau at Waimea Bay.

Since its inception in 1985 the tournament has only been held 10 times, due to a precondition that open-ocean swells reach a minimum of 20 feet (this translates to a wave face height of over 30 feet). The contest invites only 28 big-wave riders to participate in two rounds of competition. The event does not allow the use of jet skis to tow surfers into the waves.

Popular culture
In the 1980s, bumper stickers and T-shirts with the phrase "Eddie Would Go" spread around the Hawaiian Islands and to the rest of the world. According to maritime historian Mac Simpson, "Aikau was a legend on the North Shore, pulling people out of waves that no one else would dare to. That's where the saying came from – Eddie would go, when no one else would or could. Only Eddie dared."
The phrase originated during the first Eddie contest. The waves were huge and the conditions were extremely dangerous. While the contest organizers were discussing whether to put it on, Mark Foo looked at the conditions and said "Eddie would go." The phrase stuck and then Eddie went.

Another variation of the aforementioned popular phrase is "Eddie wouldn't tow." This phrase is in reference to the method of big wave surfing in which one surfer must accelerate another surfer (the former on a jet ski, the latter towed on a surfboard) to the speed of a large, fast wave. It is also partially in response to the controversy over the "unnaturalness" of tow-in surfing; many surfers feel that being towed in to a wave, as opposed to paddling, is against the spirit of the sport.

Other variations of the phrase include "Eddie would throw" (in support of the University of Hawaii's passing attack by Colt Brennan and Timmy Chang under head coach June Jones), "Eddie wouldn't crow" (in opposition to boastful and egotistical surfers), and "Eddie would hoe" (in support of Native Hawaiian agricultural outreach programs). Another variation used recently during the 2008 election campaign for Honolulu rail transit was the slogan, "Eddie would ride."

Kailua-Kona, Hawaii musician Lopaka Rootz released a reggae single honoring Eddie Aikau called "Eddie." It debuted on Kapa Radio in December 2019. Rootzʻ music is played on Hawaiian radio station KWXX FM.

Austin, Texas, band Full Service recorded a song about Eddie Aikau called "In A Rescue," found on their 2006 album "Recess." They performed the song at the Full Service Circus in May 2013.

Sam George, an ex-professional surfer, directed a 30 for 30 documentary about Aikau called Hawaiian: The Legend of Eddie Aikau. Produced by filmmaker Agi Orsi, the documentary premiered on ESPN on October 1, 2013. The documentary produced for television details Aikau's life from childhood to his death and won an Emmy for Best Sports Documentary Series, making it one of the few surf-related films to ever receive such recognition.

Eddie's story was humorously (and respectfully) told by comedian Kurt Braunohler in a second-season episode of Drunk History that was dedicated to Hawaiian history, which aired on August 12, 2014.

Eddie's story was told by Karen Kilgariff on episode 160 of the podcast My Favorite Murder, which aired February 14, 2019.

The character of Z in the animated movie Surf's Up is loosely based on Eddie's life and mysterious death.

On May 4, 2019, what would have been his 73rd birthday, he was honored with a Google Doodle.

In 2022, Aikau was featured in Naomi Hirahara's anthology We Are Here: 30 Inspiring Asian Americans and Pacific Islanders Who Have Shaped the United States that was published by the Smithsonian Institution and Running Press Kids.

See also
 Duke Kahanamoku
 List of people who disappeared mysteriously at sea

References

Works cited

External links 
 https://www.theeddieaikau.com/

Further reading

 
 Goes, Sergio. Eddie Would Go: The Story of Eddie Aikau, Hawaiian Hero [Film]

External links

 2014 Quiksilver in Memory of Eddie Aikau Contest
 Charleyproject: Eddie Aikau
 Eddie Aikau Foundation
 Globalsurfing: Eddie Surfing Wallpapers
 Quiksilver Eddie Aikau Invitational 2007
 Quiksilver Eddie Aikau 2010/2011
 Quiksilver Eddie Aikau 2011/2012
 Surfline: Eddie Aikau

1946 births
1970s missing person cases
1978 deaths
American surfers
Boating accident deaths
Hōkūleʻa
Lifeguards
Missing person cases in Hawaii
Native Hawaiian sportspeople
Native Hawaiian surfers
People declared dead in absentia
People lost at sea
Sports deaths in Hawaii
Sportspeople from Hawaii